Caíque Silva Sá (born 23 May 1992), known as Caíque Sá, is a Brazilian footballer who plays as a right back for Confiança.

Career statistics

References

External links

1992 births
Living people
Sportspeople from Bahia
Brazilian footballers
Association football defenders
Campeonato Brasileiro Série A players
Campeonato Brasileiro Série B players
Campeonato Brasileiro Série C players
Campeonato Brasileiro Série D players
Sampaio Corrêa Futebol Clube players
Associação Desportiva Confiança players
Joinville Esporte Clube players
Esporte Clube Vitória players
Goiás Esporte Clube players
Associação Chapecoense de Futebol players